Villa Allende is a city in Córdoba Province, Argentina in the department of Colón.

Villa Allende was founded in 1889 and has 27,164 inhabitants (Provincial Census 2008). Located just 19 km away from Córdoba. the economy has strong ties with the capital city and is heavily dependent on tourism.

Villa Allende is connected to the capital through Av. Donato Álvarez, that starts in the neighbourhood of Argüello and reaches Av. Padre Luchese that connects the city to the airport.

Tourism 
 Cordoba Golf Club
 Convento de San Alfonso 
 Church Nuestra Señora del Valle and other buildings designed by Augusto César Ferrari an Italian architect, painter and photographer

Populated places in Córdoba Province, Argentina